Soraya de Chadarevian is a historian of molecular biology and a professor in the Department of History and the Institute for Society and Genetics at the University of California, Los Angeles. She has numerous publications on the history of molecular life sciences.

Education 
Soraya de Chadarevian completed a five-year Diploma course in biology at the University of Freiburg, Germany and continued with a year of experimental work at the University of Bologna, Italy. She has then held many fellowships including the Walther Rathenau Program and the Max Planck Institute for History of Science in Berlin, Social Research at the Hamburg Institute, Churchill College at Cambridge, and the Institute for Advances Studies in the Humanities at the University of Edinburgh.

References 

Molecular-biology-related lists
Living people

Year of birth missing (living people)